A nationwide abrogative referendum was held in Italy on 12 and 13 June 2011, on four questions concerning the repeal of recent laws regarding the privatisation of water services (two questions), a return to the nuclear energy which had been phased out after the 1987 referendum, and criminal procedure, specifically a provision exempting the Prime Minister and the Ministers from appearing in court. The first aim of those campaigning for a yes vote was to ensure that the quorum  (50% + 1) of the electorate was reached.

Collecting the needed 500,000 signatures started in April 2010. In two months che signatures deposited where 1,4 milion. The Italian Supreme Court (Court of Cassation) validated two questions about water issues in January 2011 and ruled the referendum to be held on 12–13 June 2011.

The Italians with the right to vote numbered 47,118,352 (22,604,349 men and 24,514,003 women), in addition to 3,300,496 Italians resident abroad. In order for the quorum to be reached, at least 25.209.425 votes for each question had to be cast.

Turnout, while below general election records, was higher than it had been for any referendum since 1995; on 12 June 2011, turnout had reached 11.64% at midday, and 30.32% at 19.00, indicating that the necessary quorum would likely be reached. When polls closed on 13 June 2011, turnout was 56.9%, with clear majorities of 94.6% to 96.1% in favour on all questions, meaning that about 53,8% to 54,7% of electorate approved them. Silvio Berlusconi, the then-Prime Minister, implicitly invited to boycott the vote in the hope that the required quorum would not be met.

Position of main political parties

Parties with parliamentary representation 

ND = no direction.

High offices of the Republic 
The President of the Republic Giorgio Napolitano declared he would take part to the referendums, without revealing his intentions regarding the votes.

The President of the Senate of the Republic Renato Schifani underlined the importance of the vote as a form of democratic participation and said he would vote.

The President of the Chamber of Deputies Gianfranco Fini declared he would vote.

The President of the Council of ministers Silvio Berlusconi declared he would not vote. His statement, "the Constitution gives the right to citizens to say yes or no to the referendum, but also to say 'I do not mind this question, I do not vote'", was considered an implicit invitation for his electorate to abstain, so that the referendums would fail quorum.

Privatization of water services 
 Ballot Colour: Red.
 Description: Repeal of the law that allowed the private sector to be entrusted the management of local public services.

Profit on water services 
 Ballot Colour: Yellow
 Description: Repeal of the regulations governing the determination of tariffs for water supply services, in the part where they provided that the amount must assure a return on the invested capital.

Nuclear power 
 Ballot Colour: grey.
 Description: Repeal of the new laws that allowed the operation of nuclear powerplants on Italian territory.

Legal impediment 
 Ballot Colour: green.
 Description: Repeal of the provisions introducing legittimo impedimento, which allowed the President of the Council of Ministers and the Ministers to be excused from appearing in court if prevented from doing so by government commitments.

Results by region

References

Referendums in Italy
2011 referendums
2011 elections in Italy
Nuclear technology in Italy
Nuclear power in Italy
Nuclear power referendums
Privatisation referendums
Privatisation in Italy
June 2011 events in Italy